Svetlana Kuznetsova was the defending champion, but she subsequently lost to Italian qualifier Roberta Vinci in the first round.

First-seeded Caroline Wozniacki won the title by beating Vera Zvonareva in the final 6–3, 3–6, 6–3. Wozniacki became the first player to win titles in both Beijing and Tokyo in the same year.

After defeating Petra Kvitová in the third round, Wozniacki became the World No. 1 singles player for the first time in her career, displacing an injured Serena Williams.

Seeds

* The four Tokyo semifinalists received a bye into the second round.

Draw

Finals

Top half

Section 1

Section 2

Bottom half

Section 3

Section 4

External links
 Main Draw
 Qualifying Draw

China Open - Singles